Kvass is a fermented cereal-based low-alcohol beverage with a slightly cloudy appearance, light-brown colour and sweet-sour taste. It may be flavoured with berries, fruits, herbs, or honey.

Kvass originates from northeastern Europe, where grain production is considered insufficient for beer to become a daily drink. The first written mention of kvass is found in the Primary Chronicle, describing the celebration of Vladimir the Great's baptism in 996. In the traditional method, kvass is made from a mash obtained from rye bread or rye flour and malt soaked in hot water, fermented for about 12 hours with the help of sugar and bread yeast or baker's yeast at room temperature. In industrial methods, kvass is produced from wort concentrate combined with various grain mixtures. It is a popular drink in Russia, Ukraine, Poland, Baltic countries, Finland, and some parts of China.

Terminology
The word kvass is ultimately from Proto-Indo-European base *kwh₂et- ('to become sour'). In English it was first mentioned in a text around 1553 as quass. Nowadays, the name of the drink is almost the same in most languages: in Belarusian: , ; Russian: , ; Ukrainian: , ; in Polish:  (to differentiate it from kwas, 'acid', originally from kwaśny, 'sour'); Latvian: ; Romanian: ; Hungarian: ; Serbian: ; Chinese: , ; Eastern Finnish: . Non-cognates include Estonian , Finnish , Latvian , Latgalian dzyra (similar to Lithuanian gira), Lithuanian  (similar to Latvian ), and Swedish .

Production

In the traditional method, either dried rye bread or a combination of rye flour and rye malt is used.

The simplest industrial method produces kvass from a wort concentrate. The concentrate is warmed up and mixed with a water and sugar solution to create wort with a sugar concentration of 5–7% and pasteurized to stabilize it. Only around 1% of the extract is fermented out into ethanol, carbon dioxide and lactic acid.

Initially, it was filled in large containers, from which the kvass was sold on streets, but now, the vast majority of industrially produced kvass is filled and sold in 1–3-litre plastic bottles and has a shelf life of 4–6 weeks.

Kvass is usually 0.5–1.0% alcohol by weight, but may sometimes be as high as 2.0%.

History

The exact origins of kvass are unclear, and whether it was invented by Slavic people or any other Eastern European ethnicity is unknown, although some Polish sources claim that kvass was invented by Slavs. Kvass has existed in the northeastern part of Europe, where grain production is thought to have been insufficient for beer to become a daily drink. It has been known among the Early Slavs since the 10th century. The first written mention of kvass is found in the Primary Chronicle, describing the celebration of Vladimir the Great's baptism in 996 when kvass along with mead and food was given out to the citizens of Kiev. Kvass-making remained a daily household activity well into the 19th century.

In the second half of the 19th century, with military engagement, increasing industrialization and large-scale projects, such as the construction of the Trans-Siberian Railway, created a growing need to supply large numbers of people with foodstuff for extended periods of time, commercial kvass producers began appearing in the Russian Empire. Many of them specialised in the use of different raw ingredients, and more than 150 kvass varieties, such as apple, pear, mint, lemon, chicory, raspberry and cherry kvass, are recorded. As commercial kvass producers began selling it in barrels on the streets, domestic kvass making started to decline. For example, in the year ended 30 June 1912, there were 17 factories in the Governorate of Livonia producing a total of 437,255 gallons of kvass.

In the 1890s, the first scientific studies into the production of kvass were conducted in Kiev, and in the 1960s, commercial mass production technology of kvass was further developed by chemists in Moscow.

Belarus, Russia, Ukraine

Possibly invented in the Kievan Rus' and known there since at least the 10th century, Kvass became a national beverage of Russia and Ukraine in the 16th century.

Although the massive flood of western soft drinks after the fall of the USSR, such as Coca-Cola and Pepsi, substantially shrank the market share of kvass in Russia, in recent years, it has regained its original popularity, often marketed as a national soft drink or "patriotic" alternative to cola. For example, the Russian company Nikola has promoted its brand of kvass with an advertising campaign emphasizing "anti-cola-nisation." Moscow-based Business Analytica reported in 2008 that bottled kvass sales had tripled since 2005 and estimated that per-capita kvass consumption in Russia would reach three litres in 2008. Between 2005 and 2007, cola's share of the Moscow soft drink market fell from 37% to 32%. Meanwhile, kvass' share more than doubled over the same time period, reaching 16% in 2007. In response, Coca-Cola launched its own brand of kvass in May 2008. This is the first time a foreign company has made an appreciable entrance into the Russian kvass market. Pepsi has also signed an agreement with a Russian kvass manufacturer to act as a distribution agent. The development of new technologies for storage and distribution, and heavy advertising, have contributed to this surge in popularity; three new major brands have been introduced since 2004.

It also has a variety of kvass tasting and entertainment festivals. The largest show takes place in the city of Lida. Numerous Ukrainian brands of kvass are also sold on the Polish market.

Market shares for Russia (2014)

Poland

Kvass may have appeared in Poland as early as the 10th century, it quickly became a trendy beverage thanks to it easy and cheap method of production as well as its thirst-quenching and digestion-aiding qualities. By the time of Władysław II Jagiełło's rule kvass was universal. It was at first commonly drunk by peasants in the eastern parts of the country, but eventually, the drink spread to the szlachta. One example of this is kwas chlebowy sapieżyński kodeński, an old type of Polish kvass that is still sold as a contemporary brand. Its origins can be traced back to the 1500s, when  founded the town of Kodeń on land granted by the Polish king. He then bought the mills and 24 villages of the surrounding areas from their previous landowners. Then, the taste of kvass became known among the Polish szlachta, who used it for its supposed healing qualities. Throughout the 19th century, kvass remained popular among Poles who lived in the Congress Poland of Imperial Russia and in Austrian Galicia, especially the inhabitants of rural areas. Up until the 19th century, recipes for local variants of kvass remained well-guarded secrets of families, religious orders, and monasteries.

The beverage production in Poland on an industrial scale can be traced back to the more recent interwar period, when the Polish state regained independence as the Second Polish Republic. In interwar Poland, kvass was brewed and sold in mass numbers by magnates of the Polish drinks market like the Varsovian brewery Haberbusch i Schiele or the Karpiński company. Kvass remained particularly popular in eastern Poland. However, with the collapse of many prewar businesses and much of the Polish industry during World War II, kvass lost popularity following the aftermath of the war. It also gradually lost favour throughout the 20th century upon introducing mass-produced soft drinks and carbonated water onto the Polish market. In the early 21st-century kvass experienced a renaissance in Poland due to the heightened interest in healthy diets, natural products, and traditions.

Kvass can be found in some supermarkets and grocery stores where it is known in Polish as kwas chlebowy. Commercial bottled versions of the drink are the most common variant, as some companies specialise in manufacturing a more modern version of the drink (some variants are manufactured in Poland whilst others are imported from its neighbouring countries, Lithuania and Ukraine being the most popular source). However, old recipes for a traditional version of kvass exist; some of them originate from eastern Poland, others from more central regions include adding honey for flavour. Although commercial kvass is much easier to find in Polish shops, Polish manufacturers of more natural and healthier variants of kvass have become increasingly popular both within and outside of the country's borders. A less healthy alternative of quick to make variants using kvass concentrate can also be purchased in shops. One colloquial Polish name for kwas chlebowy is wiejska oranżada ("rural orangeade"). In some Polish villages, such as Zaława and its surroundings, kvass was traditionally produced on every farm.

Latvia

In Latvian, kvass was also called dzersis. After the dissolution of the Soviet Union in 1991, the street vendors disappeared from the streets of Latvia due to new health laws that banned its sale on the street. Economic disruptions forced many kvass factories to close. The Coca-Cola Company moved in and began quickly dominating the soft drink market. In 1998, the local soft drink industry adapted by selling bottled kvass and launching aggressive marketing campaigns. This surge in sales was stimulated by the fact that kvass sold for about half the price of Coca-Cola. In just three years, kvass constituted as much as 30% of the soft drink market in Latvia, while the market share of Coca-Cola fell from 65% to 44%. The Coca-Cola Company had losses in Latvia of about $1 million in 1999 and 2000. Coca-Cola responded by purchasing kvass manufacturers and producing kvass at their own soft drink plants.

On 30 September 2010, the Saeima adopted quality and classification requirements for kvass, defining it as "a beverage obtained by fermenting a mixture of kvass wort with a yeast of microorganism cultures to which sugar and other food sources and food additives are added or not added after the fermentation" with a maximum ABV of 1.2 per cent, and differentiating it from an unfermented non-alcoholic mixture of grain product extract, water, flavourings, preservatives, and other ingredients, which is designated as a "kvass (malt) beverage".

In 2014 Latvian kvass producers won seven medals at the Russian Beverage exposition in Moscow, with Ilgezeem's Porter Tanheiser kvass winning two gold medals. In 2019, Iļģuciema kvass ranked second in the Most Loved Latvian Beverage Brand Top, and first in the subsequent 2020 top.

Lithuania
In Lithuania, kvass is known as gira and is widely available in bottles and drafts. The first written records of kvass and kvass recipes in Lithuania appeared in the 16th century. Many restaurants in Vilnius make their own kvass', which they sell on the premises. Some brands of mass-produced Lithuanian kvass are also sold on the Polish market. Strictly speaking, gira can be made from anything fermentable—such as caraway tea, beetroot juice, or berries—but it is made mainly from black bread, or barley or rye malt.

Estonia

In Estonia, kvass is known as kali. Initially, it was made from either brewer's spent grain or wort left to ferment in a closed container, but later special kvass bread (kaljaleib) or industrially produced malt concentrate was started to be used. Nowadays, kali generally is industrially produced with the use of pasteurization, the addition of preservatives and artificial carbonation.

Finland
In Finland, a fermented drink made from a mixture of rye flour and rye malt was ubiquitous in parts of Eastern Finland and was heated in the oven. It was called kalja (which can also be used to refer to small beer) or vaasa (in Eastern Finnish), while nowadays the drink is often known as kotikalja and is available in many work canteens, gas stations, and lower-end restaurants.

Traditionally, kalja was usually made in households once a week from a mixture of malted and unmalted rye grains. Other grains, such as oats or barley, were also sometimes used; occasionally, leftover potatoes or pieces of bread were added. Everything was mixed with water in a metal cauldron or a clay pot and kept warm in the oven or by the stove for at least six hours for the mixture to darken and sweeten. Sometimes, the grain solids were filtered out through lautering. In Eastern Finland, the mixture was formed into large loaves and briefly baked for the crust to turn brown. The porridge or pieces of the malt bread were mixed into a wooden cask with water and fermented for one or two days with a previous batch, a sourdough starter, spontaneously or in more recent times with commercial baker's yeast. In the early 20th century, with sugar becoming more readily available, it started replacing the malting process, and modern kalja is made from dark rye malt, sugar and baker's yeast.

Sweden
However, it was very likely limited only to areas where rye bread was the standard bread as opposed to crispbread, which was more common in Western Sweden and did not stale.  was still being made in Öland farms up until 1935.

China

In the mid-19th century, kvass was introduced in Xinjiang, where it became known as kavas and eventually became one of the region's signature drinks. It is usually consumed cold together with barbecue. In 1900, Russian merchant Ivan Churin founded Harbin Churin Food in Heilongjiang, offering kvass and other specialities and by 2009 the company was already producing 5,000 tons of kvass a year making up 90% of the local market. In 2011, it moved its kvass factory to Tianjin, increasing its sales to 20,000 tons in the first year.

California 
By 2017, a version of Kvass developed in California was introduced. The California version uses carrots or beets in its fermentation process, and is carbonated with a light, clean and crisp flavor which is in contrast with the earthy, sour flavor of more traditional Kvass.

Elsewhere
Following the influx of immigrants in the UK due to the 2004 enlargement of the European Union, several stores selling cuisine and beverages from Eastern Europe were established, many of which stock kvass. In 2019, kvass began being produced domestically in the United Kingdom. In recent years, kvass has also become more popular in Serbia.

Nutritional composition 
Naturally fermented kvass contains 5.9%±0.02 carbohydrates, of which 5.7%±0.02 are sugars (mostly fructose, glucose and maltose), as well as 0.71±0.09, 1.28±0.12, and 18.14±0.48 mg/100 g of thiamine, riboflavin and niacin respectively. In addition to that, 19 different aroma volatile compounds have also been identified in naturally fermented kvass, most notably 4-penten-2-ol (10.05×107 PAU), which has a fruity odour, carvone (2.28×107 PAU) originating from caraway fruits used as an ingredient in rye bread, and ethyl octanoate (1.03×107 PAU), which has an odour of fruit and fat.

Traditional kvass made from rye wholemeal bread has been found to have, on average, two times higher dietary fibre content, 60% higher antioxidant activity (due to the addition of caramel and citric acid to the bread) and three times lower reducing sugar content than industrially produced kvass.

Historically, alcohol by volume (ABV) of kvass varied depending on the ingredients, microbial flora, as well as temperature and length of fermentation, but nowadays it is usually not higher than 1.5%. The wide availability and consumption of kvass, including by children of all ages, together with the lacking indication of ABV for kvass on the labels and in advertisements, has been named a possible contributor to chronic alcoholism in the former Soviet Union.

Use 
Apart from drinking, kvass is also used by families (especially the poor ones) as the basis for many dishes. Traditional cold summertime soups of Russian cuisine, such as okroshka, botvinya and tyurya, are based on kvass.

Cultural references

The name of Kvasir, a wise being in Norse mythology, is possibly related to kvass.

There is a Russian expression "Перебиваться с хлеба на квас" (literally "to clamber from bread to kvass"), which means "to live from hand to mouth" or to "scrape by" referring to the frugal practice amongst the poor peasants of making kvass from stale leftovers of rye bread. Another kvass-related term in Russian is "" (квасной патриотизм) dating back to an 1823 letter by the Russian poet Pyotr Vyazemsky, where he defines it as "unqualified praise of everything that is your own".

In the Polish language, several traditional sayings that reference kwas chlebowy exist. There is also an old Polish folk rhyming song. It shows the history of kvass in the country as having been drunk by generations of Polish reapers as a thirst-quenching beverage used during periods of hard work during the harvest season, long before it became popular as a medicinal drink among the szlachta. The words of the song go as follows:

In the Polish village of Zaława, there is a customary game known as wulkan ("volcano") that is associated with the beverage. The fermentation of sugars makes kvass slightly carbonated, thus, when shaken or heated, it can cause the liquid to suddenly and rapidly rise out of an open vessel. Playing wulkan consists of vigorously shaking a bottle of kvass shortly before handing it to someone else who is going to drink it; the sudden "shooting out" of the beverage onto the person opening the bottle is a source of entertainment for the youth of Zaława and a well-known prank during regional festivities.

In Tolstoy's War and Peace, French soldiers are aware of kvass on entering Moscow, enjoying it but referring to it as "pig's lemonade". In Sholem Aleichem's Motl, Peysi the Cantor's Son, diluted kvass is the focus of one of Motl's older brother's get-rich-quick schemes.

See also 

 Borș (bran)
 Boza
 Brottrunk
 Chicha
 Malta
 Podpiwek
 Pruno
 Rejuvelac
 Rivella

References

External links

Fermented drinks
Rye-based drinks
Belarusian drinks
Chinese drinks
Estonian drinks
Finnish drinks
Latvian drinks
Lithuanian drinks
Polish drinks
Russian drinks
Serbian drinks
Soviet cuisine
Ukrainian drinks